Corps of Guides may refer to:

 Corps of Guides (India) - a unit raised in 1846 in Peshawar by Lt. Harry Lumsden
 Guides Cavalry, a Pakistani armoured unit descended from the British Empire unit
 Guides Infantry, a Pakistani foot unit descended from the British Empire unit
 Corps of Guides (Canada)
 Corps of Mounted Guides (Portugal)

See also
 Guides Regiment, Belgian armoured unit